Priest is a 2018 South Korean television series starring Yeon Woo-jin, Jeong Yu-mi and Park Yong-woo. It aired on OCN from November 24, 2018 to January 20, 2019 every Saturday and Sunday at 22:20 (KST) time slot.

Synopsis
A story about doctors and exorcists protecting people together at a Catholic hospital in Seoul.

Cast

Main
 Yeon Woo-jin as Oh Soo-min
A dutiful and reckless Catholic priest who is a member of 643 Regia. Twenty years prior to the series, Soo-min and his father, along with priest Moon Ki-seon, witnessed the death of his mother at a young age, where she was possessed and killed by a demon due to his father's refusal to believe in exorcism preventing her from receiving one. Under priest Moon's tutelage, he becomes an exorcist.
 Jeong Yu-mi as Ham Eun-ho
A doctor at Southern Catholic Hospital who lost her faith in God at a young age when her parents died in front of her in an accident, she first encountered Soo-min when her most recent patient turns out to be possessed by an evil entity. Witnessing the exorcism of both the patient and the subsequent possession of a colleague by the same entity caused her to begin rethinking her beliefs.
 Park Yong-woo as Moon Ki-seon
A senior Catholic priest who founded 643 Regia, a group of priests that performs exorcism unofficially while still recognized by the Vatican. When he was younger, he was called upon by Soo-min to save his mother but was too late. He was the one who takes Soo-min under his wing and taught him how to conduct exorcisms.

Supporting
 Son Jong-hak as Koo Do-hyun
 Oh Yeon-ah as Shin Mi-yeon
 Yu Bee as Jung Yong-pil
 Lee Gun-myung as Lee Ki-hong
 Lee Eun-saem as Chae Yi-soo
 Jang Won-hyung as Jang Won-seok
 Cha Min-ji as Jang Kyung-ran
 Moon Sook as Go Mi-sook
 Kang Kyung-hun as Cha Sun-young
 Jang Hee-ryung as Kim Yoo-ri

Production
Priest reunites Yeon Woo-jin and Jeong Yu-mi who previously starred together in The Tunnel (2014).

The lead male role was first offered to Lee Je-hoon but he declined.

Original soundtrack

Part 1

Part 2

Ratings

References

External links
  
 Priest at Studio Dragon
 
 

OCN television dramas
Television series by Studio Dragon
Korean-language television shows
2018 South Korean television series debuts
2019 South Korean television series endings
South Korean medical television series
South Korean thriller television series